Christoffer Aagaard Melson (born 16 August 1984 in Vejle) is a Danish politician, who is a member of the Folketing for the Venstre political party. He was elected into parliament at the 2019 Danish general election.

Political career
Melson was a member of the municipal council of Vejle Municipality from 2014 to 2021. He was elected into the Folketing in 2019, receiving 7,550 personal votes.

References

External links 
 Biography on the website of the Danish Parliament (Folketinget)

1984 births
Living people
People from Vejle Municipality
Danish municipal councillors
Venstre (Denmark) politicians
Members of the Folketing 2019–2022
Members of the Folketing 2022–2026